Byrd in the Wind is an album by American jazz guitarist Charlie Byrd featuring tracks recorded in 1959 and  released on the Riverside label in 1963. The album was first released on the Washington Records Offbeat imprint as Byrd in the Wind: Jazz at the Showboat, Vol. II'''

Reception

Alex Henderson, in his review for Allmusic, states "Byrd in the Wind... isn't among the guitarist's essential albums, but it's still a decent and pleasing document of his pre-bossa nova, pre-'60s period".

Track listingAll compositions by Charlie Byrd except as indicated''
 "Swing 59" - 3:22     
 "You'd Be So Nice to Come Home To"  (Cole Porter) - 2:50     
 "Showboat Shuffle" (Duke Ellington) - 3:57     
 "Love Letters" (Edward Heyman, Victor Young) - 3:00     
 "Cross Your Heart" (Buddy DeSylva, Lewis Gensler) - 2:17     
 "Keter's Dirty Blues"  (Byrd, Keter Betts) - 4:11     
 "You're a Sweetheart" (Harold Adamson, Jimmy McHugh) - 2:31     
 "Stars Fell on Alabama" (Mitchell Parish, Frank Perkins) - 3:15     
 "You Came a Long Way From St. Louis"  (John Benson Brooks, Bob Russell) - 3:30     
 "Wait Till You See Her" (Lorenz Hart, Richard Rodgers) - 2:53     
 "Georgia on My Mind" (Hoagy Carmichael, Stuart Gorrell) - 3:08     
 "Copacabana" (João de Barro, Alberto Ribeiro) - 2:53

Personnel 
 Charlie Byrd – guitar
 Buck Hill – tenor saxophone
 Wallace Mann – flute
 Richard White – oboe
 Kenneth Pasmanick – bassoon
 Charlie Schneer – piano
 Keter Betts – double bass
 Bertell Knox – drums
 Ginny Byrd – vocals

References 

1959 albums
Charlie Byrd albums
Riverside Records albums